Abdul Ghafoor Breshna (Pashto: عبدالغفور بريښنا) (10 April 1907 – 4 January 1974) was an Afghan painter, music composer, poet, and film director. He is regarded as one of the country's most talented artists. He also composed the former national anthem of Afghanistan that was used during the 1970s.

Early life and education
Breshana was born as Abdul Ghafoor on 10 April 1907 in Kabul, Afghanistan. The word Breshna means lightning, which he added as a last name. In 1921, he was amongst the students who were sent to Germany for higher education by Amanullah Khan. He studied painting and lithography at Academy of Fine Arts, Munich.

Personal life
In Germany, Breshna married Marguerhee and returned to Afghanistan in 1931.

Death and legacy
He died on 4 January 1974 in his birth city of Kabul. Most of his artwork was lost or destroyed during the many years of war in Afghanistan. Only some remain, and he is being remembered now as one of Afghanistan's most talented artists.

Career
Breshna composed the Afghan national anthem that was used from 1973 to 1978.

Exhibitions
Breshna's work was displayed all over world like Tehran (1953, 1966), Delhi (1954, 1974), Cairo (1956), New York City (1957), Moscow (1965,1973), Peking (1967), Sofia (1967), Cannes (1971) and Dushambe (1972).

Gallery

See also

 Kamāl ud-Dīn Behzād
 Culture of Afghanistan

Notes

Afghan artists
People from Kabul
Afghan film directors
1907 births
1974 deaths
Knights Commander of the Order of Merit of the Federal Republic of Germany
National anthem writers
Afghan painters